Modou Faal (11 February 2003) is a Gambian professional footballer who plays as a forward for Championship club West Bromwich Albion.

Early life
Faal was born in The Gambia but relocated to Birmingham, England with his family when he was seven years old.

Club career
Faal joined the West Bromwich Albion academy in November 2019, at the age of 16, after impressing during a two-week trial. He had been scouted while playing local football for Sutton Coldfield Town in Birmingham. He made an early impression and became the first scholar in West Brom history to play for the U-23’s, featuring in a number of matches for Deon Burton’s side during the 2020–21 campaign. He was also a regular fixture in Albion’s U-18 side and enjoyed a prolific season, scoring seven goals.

He made his professional debut on 25 August 2021, coming on as a substitute for Kenneth Zohore, in a 0–6 loss to Arsenal in the second round of the EFL Cup.

On 5 March 2022, he signed for National League North side Hereford on a one-month loan deal, with The Bulls just outside the play-offs in 8th position.

On 2 December 2022, Faal moved to AFC Fylde of the National League North on a one-month loan deal. The loan was later extended until the end of the season. He was recalled on 6 March 2023. His performances prior to his recall saw him win the February National League North Player of the Month award having scored five goals across the month.

Career statistics

Honours 
West Bromwich Albion U23
 Premier League Cup: 2021–22

Individual
National League North Player of the Month: February 2023

References

2003 births
Living people
Gambian footballers
English footballers
Footballers from Birmingham, West Midlands
Gambian emigrants to England
English people of Gambian descent
Association football defenders
West Bromwich Albion F.C. players
Hereford F.C. players
AFC Telford United players
AFC Fylde players
National League (English football) players